The  are four wooden posts or pillars that stand on the four corners of local shrines in the Lake Suwa area of Nagano Prefecture (historical Shinano Province), Japan.

During the festival, sixteen specially chosen fir trees are felled and then transported down a mountain, where they are then erected at the four corners of each shrine.

Background

Suwa Shrine

The shrine's deity, known either as Suwa Daimyōjin or Takeminakata, was worshipped since antiquity as a god of wind and water, as well as a patron of hunting and warfare. In this latter capacity, he enjoyed a particularly fervent cult from various samurai clans during the Middle Ages. The Upper Shrine is dedicated to Suwa Daimyōjin himself, while his consort, the goddess , is worshipped in the Lower Shrine.

The 

These pillars are all currently made out of momi fir tree trunks, though wood from other trees such as larch or Japanese cedar were also used in the past.

An 's girth is traditionally determined by measuring the uncut tree's circumference at eye level, . The actual thickness of the logs used may vary: the largest  in recent history in terms of girth is the 's  used in the festival of 1950 (Shōwa 25).

Aside from the large  at Suwa Shrine, smaller  are also erected in its branch shrines throughout the country.  are also found in many local shrines in historical Suwa district (see pictures on left).

Origins and symbolism

The 's origins and original purpose are shrouded in mystery. They have been variously interpreted among other things as relics of much larger structures, a kind of barrier or boundary marker (cf. the Korean jangseung), as totem poles, or even as symbolic substitutes for rebuilding the entire shrine complex. Some scholars meanwhile consider the practice of erecting sacred pillars to derive ultimately from prehistoric tree worship, citing the remains of wooden poles or slabs discovered in various Jōmon period sites in apparently ritualistic contexts as potential parallels to the Suwa .

and Chinese philosophy

Possible influences by the Chinese theory of the five elements and the concept of the Earthly Branches in the ceremony of erecting —at least that of the Upper Shrine—have been observed. For instance, the ritual roughly reflects the elements' cycle of generation (wood begets fire, fire begets earth, earth begets metal), in that the Upper Shrine's  are made out of trees from a mountain to the east (associated with the element of wood) and are brought to the shrine, located south (fire) of Lake Suwa (north, water) in order to replace old  (earth), which are taken down and brought to Hachiryū Shrine in the former village of Chū-kaneko (with  meaning metal), now a part of Suwa City. The custom of hammering ornamental sickles to the trees selected to become  has also been linked to the idea of the element of metal overcoming wood, with the sickle being thought to pacify or 'cut' violent winds, which is associated with the wood element (cf. Suwa Daimyōjin being a wind god).

The zodiac signs of the Tiger and the Horse are both associated with the 'birth' and 'peak' aspects of fire.

History of the festival

Origins

"Great Festival (of the) Periodic Building (of the Shrines and the) "), is popularly reckoned to have a 1,200 year history. The Suwa Daimyōjin Ekotoba (written 1356) claims that the custom of reconstructing shrine edifices during the years of the Monkey and the Tiger started during the reign of Emperor Kanmu in the late 8th to early 9th century (early Heian period).

One legend concerning Suwa Daimyōjin claims that he appeared to the general Sakanoue no Tamuramaro, appointed by Emperor Kanmu to subjugate the indigenous Emishi of northeastern Japan. In thanksgiving for the god's miraculous assistance in Tamuramaro's campaign, the imperial court was said to have decreed the establishment of the various religious ceremonies of Suwa Shrine.

Kamakura, Muromachi, and Sengoku periods

Such was indeed the case until the shrines experienced a period of decline during the Sengoku period.

The rebuilding of the shrines was undertaken by artisans assembled from all across the province, while thousands of people were assigned the task of erecting the  into place, one or two thousand for each pillar.

Due to the exorbitant amount of money required for the project, locals traditionally avoided or postponed special occasions like marriages, coming-of-age ceremonies, or even funerals during the year. In addition, observance of the event in the proper time was considered essential: failure to obey these taboos was thought to incur divine punishment.

The upheavals of the Sengoku period threatened Suwa Shrine and its religious rites. Indeed, the shrine's ceremonies would have been lost to oblivion had not the warlord Takeda Shingen, a staunch devotee of the Suwa deity, took steps to revive their performance.

In 1582 (Tenshō 10), the eldest son of Oda Nobunaga, Nobutada, led an army into Takeda-controlled Shinano and burned the Upper Shrine of Suwa to the ground. The shrine, which was destroyed in the invasion, was subsequently rebuilt on schedule two years later, in 1584 (Tenshō 12, year of the Yang Wood Monkey).

Edo period onwards

The introduction of the bakuhan system in the Edo period effectively ended the 'perpetual' obligation of periodically rebuilding the shrines and replacing their  being imposed on the whole province of Shinano. Since then, these duties became the sole affair of the villages of Suwa (a.k.a. Takashima) Domain, where the shrines were.

It is from around the Edo and the following Meiji periods that the raising of the  gradually turned into a grand festival, overshadowing the  itself. It is thought that some of the current practices associated with the event may have been influenced by the rebuilding ceremony practiced at Ise Shrine. By the later half of the period, viewing galleries were being built for the huge crowds who gathered to witness the festival.

The establishment of State Shinto after the Meiji Restoration in 1868 changed the religious landscape of Suwa. As the union between Shinto and Buddhism that existed then at the shrines—as in most places in Japan—was brought to an end and control over the Upper and Lower Shrines (merged into a single institution in 1871) was turned over from local priestly families to the government, the Onbashira Festival itself underwent massive changes.

In 1890, it was decided that lottery will be used henceforth to determine which villages will be assigned which  during a given festival. While the villages under the Upper Shrine's jurisdiction (currently districts in the modern-day cities of Chino and Suwa, the town of Fujimi, and the village of Hara) are still allotted their respective  via lottery to this very day, the responsible villages for the Lower Shrine's  soon decided to do away with the lottery for the 1902 festival and instead permanently assigned particular villages to a particular , an arrangement that continues to this day.

Unlike the Upper Shrine, which had a specially-designated area from which to obtain the wooden logs, the Lower Shrine originally used tree trunks obtained from different nearby mountains; it was not until 1895 that the forest of Higashimata  in Shimosuwa was established as the sole source for the Lower Shrine's  and the current route which passes through the hill was adopted.

He is said to have repeated the same feat during the subsequent five festivals, making him a local legend. It apparently took some time for others to imitate Nakamura: a photograph attached to a newspaper article about the festival in 1920 distinctly shows no one on the  depicted. It was only from the festivals of 1926 and 1932 that reports of log-riding began to appear.

During the final years of World War II, as Japan's military situation became more desperate, the government began altering its original conscription laws, so that in 1943, all male students over the age of 20 became subject to the draft, whereas they had formerly been exempted. By 1944, men under 20—some as young as 15—were being pressured to serve in the military. Due to the lack of able-bodied adult men, the Onbashira Festival of 1944 (Shōwa 19) was performed mainly by women (who formerly did not take part in the proceedings) and by older men who were not pressed into military service. It has since become customary to pray for safety during the proceedings before a monument dedicated to his memory.

The festival of 1950 (Shōwa 25), the first to be held after the war, marked the first time women were officially allowed to participate in the event.

Description of the festival

Selecting the trees

In the Upper Shrine's case, a preliminary inspection is performed two years before a given festival, with the formal selection process being held a year after this.

The Upper Shrine's  are made from momi fir trees procured from Mount Okoya—part of the Southern Yatsugatake Mountains—in the village of Hara, while those of the Lower Shrine are taken from the forest of Higashimata  in the town of Shimosuwa.

literally means "coming out of the mountains". The logs are decorated in red and white regalia, the traditional colors of Shinto ceremonies, and ropes are attached. During , teams of people drag the logs down the mountain towards the shrine. The course of the logs goes over rough terrain, and at certain points the logs must be skidded or dropped down steep slopes.

During , held about a month later, the logs are paraded to the four shrine buildings where they will be erected: Honmiya, Maemiya, Harumiya, and Akimiya. Four  are erected at each building, one at each corner. The logs are raised with ropes by hand, and while they are being raised, a ceremonial group of log bearers ride the logs and sing and perform other feats. This ceremony was performed as part of the opening ceremonies of the 1998 Winter Olympics in Nagano.

After the two festivals, there is an important event, the "Building of ".

Incidents
 has a reputation for being the most dangerous festival in Japan, and it has led to the injury and death of participants. There were fatal incidents in 1980, 1986, 1992, 2010, and 2016. In 1992, two men drowned while a log was being pulled across a river. Two other men were injured in the same accident, which organizers say occurred when a guide-wire supporting the  tree gave way. In 2016, one man died falling from a tree as it was being raised at the shrine.

See also
 Suwa taisha
 Takeminakata
 Mishaguji
 Totem pole

References

Works cited

Inoue, Takami (2003). "The Interaction between Buddhist and Shinto Traditions at Suwa Shrine." In

External links

  Onbashira Web (in Japanese)

Festivals in Japan
Tourist attractions in Nagano Prefecture
Suwa faith